The 1988 Navy Midshipmen football team represented the United States Naval Academy as an independent during the 1988 NCAA Division I-A football season.

Schedule

Personnel

References

Navy
Navy Midshipmen football seasons
Navy Midshipmen football